Soonabai Pestonji Hakimji High School is a school located in Bordi, Maharashtra, India. Established in 1920

Medium
Marathi, Gujarati, English (Chitre Guruji English high school founded in 1993)

Campus
The whole campus, known as ‘Aacharya Bhise VidyaNagar’ (आचार्य भिसे विद्यानगर) comprises different institutes and organisations under Gokhale Education Society, Nashik. Spread across the vast campus along a kilometer long stretch on the Bordi-Gholvad coastal road.

The list of institutions in the campus are mentioned below:
1st-4th STD Gujrathi Medium primary school
SPH Marathi & Gujarati High School
5th-10th STD Marathi Medium High school
5th-10th STD Gujrathi Medium High school
Prin. Atmarampant Save K.G & Primary English School
Pujya Chitre Guruji English Medium Highschool
Godrej Technical Institute & MCVC Junior College
Phirojsha Godrej Science & Commerce Junior College
Engg. Diploma Katgara Polytechnic institute
N. B. Meheta Science college (B.Sc. & M.Sc.)
Commerce college (B. Com.)
Sau. LJ Pathare IT Institute. (Bachelors & Masters courses)

Facilities
School has large campus which includes 2 assembly halls, library, computer center, workshops, laboratory.

Athletic facilities include the campus has two large play grounds divided by TranswalGymkhana

Syllabus
The syllabus is based on the SSC board pattern. There are half yearly and terminal examinations. After class 8, the students choose from optionals such as Computer Applications, Vocational Education.

Administration
It appoints a student council to administer the school. The teacher's and other staff help maintain order.

Events
Cultural Program and other Extracurricular activities are held throughout the year

Annual sports are held in December where all students participate actively in either the sporting disciplines or the other categories.
The Price Distribution for sports winner held on every year 11 January.

An Investiture ceremony is also held every year where the School Council swearing-in and felicitation of the Board toppers is done.

Notable alumni
Ratnakar Gayakwad: Chief Secretary, State Govt. Maharashtra
Tarabai Vartak: ex-Minister
Bhausaheb Vartak: ex-Minister
Vijay Manjrekar:Cricketer
Amol Palekar :Film Actor, Director & Producer
Hemchandra Gupte :Mayor of Mumbai
S. R. Patkar:Mayor of Mumbai
Dr. Chandrakant Kulkarni: Director of Fishery Board, Govt. of India.
Pratap Save
Dr. S.D. Vartak
M. Mamsa
Vijay Bhatt: Gujarati Actor
Ashok Bhalchandra Patil: Noted Multinational Businessman
Milind Patil: MEP Consultant, UAE, USA & UK

References 

official website

External links
official website

High schools and secondary schools in Maharashtra
Education in Palghar district